Thomas Henry Howell (born 14 September 1987) is an English former first-class cricketer.

Howell was born at Derby in September 1987. He was educated at The Ecclesbourne School, before going up to New College, Oxford. While studying at Oxford, he made two appearances in first-class cricket for Oxford University against Cambridge University in The University Matches of 2007 and 2008. In the 2007 match, he scored 82 runs opening the batting for Oxford.

References

External links

1987 births
Living people
Cricketers from Derby
Alumni of New College, Oxford
English cricketers
Oxford University cricketers